is a subway station in Kita, Tokyo, Japan, operated jointly by the Tokyo subway operator Tokyo Metro and the third-sector railway operator Saitama Railway Corporation.

Lines
The station is numbered "N-19" on the Tokyo Metro network.

Station layout
The station concourse with ticket vending machines and barriers is located on the 2nd basement ("B2F") level, and the tracks are located on the 3rd basement ("B3F") level.

Platforms
The station has one island platform serving two tracks. The platforms are equipped with full-height platform screen doors.

Facilities and accessibility
The station concourse and platforms have elevator access. Universal access toilets are available on the 2nd basement level.

History
Akabane-Iwabuchi Station opened on the TRTA (present-day Tokyo Metro) Namboku Line on 29 November 1991. The Saitama Rapid Railway Line extending northward from the station opened on 28 March 2001.

The station facilities were inherited by Tokyo Metro after the privatization of the TRTA in 2004.

Passenger statistics
In fiscal 2011, the station was used by an average of 72,807 Tokyo Metro passengers daily and 34,395 Saitama Rapid Railway Line (boarding passengers only).

Surrounding area

 Akabane Station (approximately 400 m away)
 
 Arakawa River
 Seibi Gakuen College
 Iwabuchi Elementary School
 No. 4 Iwabuchi Elementary School
 Akabane Elementary School

See also
 List of railway stations in Japan

References

External links

 Tokyo Metro station information
 Saitama Railway station information 

Tokyo Metro Namboku Line
Railway stations in Tokyo
Railway stations in Japan opened in 1991